Frank Kahlil  Wheaton is an American attorney, agent, and actor.

Biography
Frank(ert) Kahlil Wheaton was born September 27, 1951 in Los Angeles, California, but raised in nearby Compton. He is the son of James Wheaton.

In 1969, Wheaton graduated from Centennial High School in Compton where he served as senior class president and was voted "most popular" in the senior class poll.   He attended Willamette University in Salem, Oregon before transferring to Cal State Northridge, where he received a degree in broadcasting. Upon graduation, Frank began working at KPFK and other radio stations in the Los Angeles area.  Eventually, he relocated to the East Coast, where he added acting and modeling to his resume.  On September 23, 1975 he married vocalist Jean Carn in Washington, DC.  They later divorced.  He received a JD degree from the University of West Los Angeles in 1982, and was admitted to the Indiana State Bar in 1987.

Wheaton founded The Management Group Sports/Entertainment Representatives in 1984. There he began acting as an agent to actors and sports figures, specializing in securing product endorsements and producing special events such as the Michael Jordan Celebrity Golf Tournament for the United Negro College Fund and working with Milton Berle on the Ruth Berle Celebrity Golf Tournament for the benefit of the American Cancer Society.  For several years, Wheaton served on the board of the Black Entertainment and Sports Lawyers Association (BESLA).

Wheaton has also served as a producer of sports-related programming.  He was an executive producer of an hour-long special entitled, "Sports Greats:One on One with David Hartman" which aired on ESPN.

In 2001, he made an unsuccessful bid to unseat incumbent Compton, California City Councilmember Yvonne Arceneaux. After forcing Arceneaux into a runoff, Wheaton lost by only 1,819 votes in the general election.

As an attorney, he has represented Essie Mae Washington-Williams, the interracial daughter of US Senator Strom Thurmond, and Alfred Jackson, the half-brother of the musician Prince.

References

External links
 Official Website
 
 

1951 births
Living people
American male film actors
American male television actors
People from Compton, California
California State University, Northridge alumni
Willamette University alumni
American sports agents
American lawyers
Television producers from California
Male actors from California